Kargowa  is a town in Zielona Góra County, Lubusz Voivodeship, Poland, with 3,769 inhabitants (2019).

Though located in the Lubusz Voivodeship, Kargowa is part of the Greater Poland historic region.

History
Kargowa was first mentioned in the 14th century. It was granted town rights by King John II Casimir Vasa in 1661. In the 18th century Kings Augustus II the Strong and Augustus III of Poland often visited the town during their travels between Warsaw and Dresden. In the 18th century the town was the site of two battles. During the War of the Polish Succession, in 1735, a battle was fought between Poles and Saxons. During the Second Partition of Poland in 1793, Kargowa was one of the places of Polish resistance against Prussia and a defensive battle took place. In 1807 Kargowa became part of the short-lived Polish Duchy of Warsaw and in 1815 was annexed by Prussia for the second time. After Poland regained independence Kargowa was captured by Polish insurgents in 1919, however, the Treaty of Versailles granted the town to Germany. The town finally returned to Poland after the defeat of Nazi Germany in World War II in 1945.

Notable people
Karl von Hänisch, military general
Maciej Kozłowski, actor
Carl Gottfried Drange, one of Angela Merkel's maternal ancestors was a master miller here

Twin towns – sister cities
See twin towns of Gmina Kargowa.

Gallery

References

External links

Jewish Community in Kargowa on Virtual Shtetl

Cities and towns in Lubusz Voivodeship
Zielona Góra County